The 1995 Gulf Club Champions Cup, is an annually organized football league tournament for club of the Arabian Peninsula. It was the 12th edition and was started on 5 December and finished with the final round on 16 December 1994, and all the matches were played in Al Ain, United Arab Emirates. Kazma won the title for the second time in their history.

Results

Winner

References

 
 

GCC Champions League
1994 in Asian football